Palaemon paivai is a species of shrimp of the family Palaemonidae. It is endemic to the state of Ceará, Brazil.

References

Crustaceans described in 1967
Palaemonidae
Arthropods of Brazil
Endemic fauna of Brazil